The 2011 Men's Queensland Basketball League season was the 26th running of the competition. The Mackay Meteors won the championship in 2011 to claim their first league title.

The teams for this season were: Brisbane Capitals, Bundaberg Bulls, Caboolture Suns, Cairns Marlins, Gladstone Port City Power, Gold Coast Rollers, Ipswich Force, Mackay Meteors, Maroochydore Clippers, Northside Wizards, Rockhampton Rockets, South West Metro Pirates, Toowoomba Mountaineers and Townsville Heat.

Team information

Standings

Finals

*The team that finishes 1st overall goes straight through to the semi-finals.

**The top two teams from each pool face-off in the quarter-finals.

QF 1: 1st in Pool A vs. 2nd in Pool A
QF 2: 1st in Pool B vs. 2nd in Pool C
QF 3: 1st in Pool C vs. 2nd in Pool B

Awards

Player of the Week

Coach of the Month

Statistics leaders

Regular season
 Most Valuable Player: Tom Garlepp (Brisbane Capitals)
 Coach of the Year: Mick Conlon (Gold Coast Rollers)
 U23 Youth Player of the Year: Todd Blanchfield (Townsville Heat)
 All-League Team:
 G: Rhys Martin (Mackay Meteors)
 G: Shaun Gleeson (Ipswich Force)
 F: Tom Garlepp (Brisbane Capitals)
 F: Todd Blanchfield (Townsville Heat)
 C: Willie Shackleford (Bundaberg Bulls)

Finals
 Grand Final MVP: Deba George (Mackay Meteors)

References

External links
 2011 QBL Official Draw
 2011 QBL Playoffs
 Quarter-final wraps –   
 QBL draw kind to Rockets
 Former Rocket Blasts off; Martin Stars as Meteors Down Rocky
 2011 QBL Report Card

2011
2010–11 in Australian basketball
2011–12 in Australian basketball